Kućište may refer to:

 Kuqishtë, a village in Kosovo
 Kućište, Croatia, a village in Croatia